Telina is a suburb of Gladstone in the Gladstone Region, Queensland, Australia.

History 
The suburb takes its name from a 1960s subdivision name.

Education 

There are no schools in Telina. The nearest primary school is in neighbouring Kin Kora and the nearest secondary school is Toolooa State High School in South Gladstone.

Amenities 
Gladstone Uniting Church is at 1 Uniting Place (corner of Dixon Drive). It is part of the Central Queensland Presbytery of the Uniting Church in Australia.

References 

Suburbs of Gladstone